Mordecai Herman was a pioneering Black Hebrew Israelite religious leader in New York City who founded the Moorish Zionist temple at 127 West 134th Street in Harlem.

Life
A Caribbean immigrant to New York City, Herman claimed direct Ethiopian lineage. Like other Black Hebrew Israelite religious leaders, Herman believed that Afro-Caribbean people had admixture with Iberian Sephardi Jews. Herman spoke Hebrew, as well as some Yiddish. Herman founded the Moorish Zionist temple in Harlem in 1921. One of the earliest Black Hebrew Israelite congregations in New York City, the Congregation of the Moorish Zionist Temple of the Moorish Jews in Harlem blended the belief that Black people were the descendants of the Biblical Israelites with aspects of traditional Judaism, elements from Christianity, and aspects of pan-African nationalism. Herman was a supporter of the Garveyist movement and was a member of Marcus Garvey's Universal Negro Improvement Association (UNIA). Herman was a Zionist who supported a shared homeland for Black Jews and others in Palestine.

Legacy
In 2016, a mural in Jerusalem was unveiled that honors Mordecai Herman. The mural was painted by the British-Israeli artist Solomon Souza.

According to the Black Orthodox Jewish writer and activist Shais Rishon, Mordecai Herman was non-Jewish as Herman never "belonged or converted to any branch of Judaism." Rishon believes that the Black Hebrew Israelite movement is not part of "the mainstream normative Black Jewish community" that practices Rabbinic Judaism.

See also
Black Jews in New York City

References

American Freemasons
American pan-Africanists
American Zionists
Black Hebrew Israelite religious leaders
People from Harlem
Universal Negro Improvement Association and African Communities League members